Love Unlimited is an American female vocal trio.

Love Unlimited may also refer to:

 The Love Unlimited Orchestra, an American 40-piece string-laden orchestra
 Love Unlimited (Love Unlimited album), an album by the vocal trio
 Love Unlimited (Dreams Come True album)
 "Love Unlimited" (song), the Bulgarian entry for Eurovision 2012, sung by Sofi Marinova
 "Love Unlimited", a track from the 1998 Fun Lovin' Criminals album 100% Colombian